Monique Éwanjé-Épée Lewin (née Éwanjé-Épée, formerly Tourret; born 11 July 1967) is a retired French track and field athlete who competed in the 60m hurdles and 100m hurdles, and is the co-holder (as of 2016) of the French national records  for both events. She is the 1990 European Champion and the 1991 World Indoor silver medallist. She also represented France at the Olympic Games in 1988, 1992 and 1996.

Career
Éwanjé-Épée was born in Poitiers, France. She won the 1985 European Junior Championships 100 metres hurdles title in 13.10 secs. In 1988, she reached the Olympic final in Seoul, finishing seventh. In 1989, she won the 100 metres hurdles titles at both the Jeux de la Francophonie and the Universiade. In March 1990, she won a silver medal in the 60m hurdles at the European Indoor Championships in Glasgow, behind Ludmila Narozhilenko of the Soviet Union.

Éwanjé-Épée reached her peak in the  1990 outdoor season, improving her own French 100m hurdles record to 12.56 on 29 June. This was the second fastest time in the world for 1990, with only Nataliya Grigoryeva of the Soviet Union going faster with 12.53. On 30 August, Ewanje-Épée won the European title in Split with 12.79. At the end of the 1990 season, both Track and Field News magazine and the Athletics International Annual, ranked Ewanje-Épée the number one 100m hurdler on their world merit rankings, ahead of Grigoryeva. In the 1991 indoor season, she won a silver medal in the 60m hurdles at the World Indoor Championships in Seville, narrowly losing out to Narozhilenko by two-hundredths of a second. Outdoors, she finished fourth in the 100m hurdles final at the 1991 World Championships in Tokyo, behind Narozhilenko, Gail Devers and Grigoryeva.

Éwanjé-Èpée won a silver medal in the 60m hurdles at the 1992 European Indoor Championships in Genoa, once again behind Narozhilenko and ahead of Yordanka Donkova. Outdoors, she competed at her second Olympics, where she was eliminated in the heats of the 100m hurdles. Having missed the 1993 season through pregnancy, she returned in 1994 competing under her then married name of Monique Tourret, and went on to finish fourth in the 60m hurdles final at the 1995 World Indoor Championships. In 1996, she won a bronze medal in the 60m hurdles at the European Indoor Championships, before going on to compete at her third Olympic Games, where she was eliminated in the quarter-finals.

Éwanjé-Épée is still the holder of the French national outdoor record for the women's 100m hurdles (12.56 sec), set on 29 June 1990 in Villeneuve d'Ascq, France. This record was equalled by Cindy Billaud in 2014. Her French national indoor record for the women's 60m hurdles (7.82 sec), set on 23 February 1991 in Paris, also still stands. It was equalled on 7 March 2004 by Linda Ferga at the
2004 World Indoor Championships in Budapest.

Personal life
Éwanjé-Épée is married to gospel singer Frederick Lewin, with whom she has a son, Joachim (born 2006). She was previously married to the French pole vaulter Christophe Tourret, with whom she has two daughters, Marylou (1993) and Olivia (1997). Her elder sister, Maryse Éwanjé-Épée, is the French record holder in the high jump and reached the Olympic high jump final in 1984 and 1988.

Results in international competitions

References 

 
 
 Peter Matthews (Hrsg.): Athletics 1997. Surbiton 1997,  
 Ekkehard zur Megede: The Modern Olympic Century 1896-1996 Track and Field Athletics. Berlin 1999 (published by Deutsche Gesellschaft für Leichtathletik-Dokumentation e.V.)

External links
 
 
 

1967 births
Living people
French female hurdlers
Olympic athletes of France
Sportspeople from Poitiers
French sportspeople of Cameroonian descent
French people of Catalan descent
Athletes (track and field) at the 1988 Summer Olympics
Athletes (track and field) at the 1992 Summer Olympics
Athletes (track and field) at the 1996 Summer Olympics
European Athletics Championships medalists
Universiade medalists in athletics (track and field)
Universiade gold medalists for France